Gordon may refer to:

People
 Gordon (given name), a masculine given name, including list of persons and fictional characters
 Gordon (surname), the surname
 Gordon (slave), escaped to a Union Army camp during the U.S. Civil War
 Clan Gordon, a Scottish clan

Education
 Gordon State College, a public college in Barnesville, Georgia
 Gordon College (Massachusetts), a Christian college in Wenham, Massachusetts
 Gordon College (Pakistan), a Christian college in Rawalpindi, Pakistan
 Gordon College (Philippines), a public university in Subic, Zambales
 Gordon College of Education, a public college in Haifa, Israel

Places

Australia
Gordon, Australian Capital Territory 
Gordon, New South Wales 
Gordon, South Australia
Gordon, Victoria
Gordon River, Tasmania
Gordon River (Western Australia)

Canada
Gordon Parish, New Brunswick
Gordon/Barrie Island, municipality in Ontario
Gordon River (Chochocouane River), a river in Quebec

Scotland
Gordon (district), Aberdeenshire, forming a local government district from 1975 to 1996
Gordon, Scottish Borders, Berwickshire (now the Scottish Borders council area)
Gordon (Scottish Parliament constituency), Scotland
Gordon (UK Parliament constituency), Scotland
Gordon Castle, Moray

United States
Gordon, Alabama
Gordon, Alaska
Gordon, Florida
Gordon, Georgia, in Wilkinson County
Gordon County, Georgia
Gordon, Illinois
Gordon, Kansas
Gordon, Kentucky
Gordon, Maryland
Gordon Township, Minnesota
Gordon, Nebraska
Gordon Heights, New York
Gordon, Ohio
Gordon, Pennsylvania
Gordon, Texas
Gordon, Ashland County, Wisconsin
Gordon, Douglas County, Wisconsin
Gordon (CDP), Wisconsin, census-designated place in Douglas County

Motor manufacturers
 Gordon (1903–1904) (Gordon Cycle & Motor Company Ltd), British manufacturer of bicycles and motor cars on Seven Sisters Road, London
 Gordon Newey, Newey, Newey-Aster, Gordon Newey Ltd, G.N.L. (GNL), (1907–1920), British automobile manufacturer from Birmingham
 Gordon (1912–1916), Gordon Armstrong, British cyclecar produced in Beverley Yorkshire by 'East-Riding Engineering'
 Gordon England (coachbuilder) 1920s coachbuilding and racing car manufacturer owned by Eric Gordon England
 Gordon (1954–1958) (Vernon Industries), British three wheeled motorcar built at Bidston, Cheshire
 Gordon GT (1959), (See Gordon-Keeble)
 Gordon-Keeble (1960–1961; 1964–1967), British car marque, made first in Slough, then Eastleigh, and finally in Southampton

Transportation
 Gordon railway station, Sydney, on the North Shore line
 Gordon railway station, Victoria, on the Melbourne - Ballarat line

Other uses
 Gordon (album), first album by the Canadian pop band Barenaked Ladies
 Duke of Gordon, British title
 Fairey Gordon, British light bomber of the 1930s and 1940s
 Gordon Castle, in Scotland
 Gordon Highlanders, infantry regiment
 Gordon's Gin, established 1769
 Gordon model, stock valuation model by Myron Gordon
 Gordon (printing press) (1821–1878), common model of open-platten printing press
 Gordon RFC, Sydney rugby union club
 Gordon Riots, in 18th-century Britain
 Gordon Robinson, character on the long-running children's TV show Sesame Street
 Gordon Shumway, 'true' name of the protagonist on the TV series ALF
 Gordon the Big Engine, fictional locomotive from Thomas the Tank Engine and Friends series
 Gordon Heuckeroth (born 1968), Dutch performer and radio and television personality, known professionally by the mononym Gordon
 "Gordons" (Orange Is the New Black), a 2018 television episode
 Tropical Storm Gordon, name of several Atlantic hurricanes

See also
 Gordan, variant of the name Gordon
 Gorden, variant of the name Gordon
 Gordonia (disambiguation), derivative of Gordon
 Justice Gordon (disambiguation)